The city of Portland, Oregon, contains many bridges over various geographical features and roads of varying lengths and usages. Some bridges carry roads, some carry pedestrians only, some carry trains only, and others have various restrictions.

Bridges over the Willamette River comprise a majority of the notable bridges in the city. Portland has 12 bridges that span the Willamette, while only two road bridges cross the Columbia River, and other notable bridges cross roads, canyons or other bodies of water. Interstate 5 crosses the Willamette via the Marquam Bridge and the Columbia via the Interstate Bridge. Due to the large number of bridges crossing the Willamette in the center of town, Portland's nicknames include "Bridge City" and "Bridgetown."

List of bridges

Columbia River system

Willamette River

Others

Former bridges
Madison Street Bridge

See also

 
 
 
 List of crossings of the Willamette River
 Sauvie Island Bridge – located just outside the city of Portland proper

References

External links
 

 
Portland, Oregon
Portland, Oregon
Bridges, Portland